Helen Dobson (born 25 February 1971) is an English professional golfer who played on the LPGA Tour.

Dobson won the 1989 British Ladies Amateur.

Dobson won once on the LPGA Tour in 1993. She also finished second at the 1998 Nabisco Dinah Shore, finishing one shot behind the winner, Pat Hurst.

Amateur wins 
1989 English Women's Amateur Championship, British Ladies Amateur, Ladies' British Open Amateur Stroke Play Championship

Professional wins (1)

LPGA Tour wins (1)

LPGA Tour playoff record (1–0)

Ladies European Tour wins (1)
1993 BMW European Masters

Team appearances
Amateur
Women's Home Internationals (representing England): 1987 (winners), 1988, 1989 (winners)
European Lady Junior's Team Championship (representing England): 1988 (winners), 1990
Vagliano Trophy (representing Great Britain & Ireland): 1989 (winners)
Curtis Cup (representing Great Britain & Ireland): 1990
European Ladies' Team Championship (representing England): 1989

References

English female golfers
LPGA Tour golfers
Winners of ladies' major amateur golf championships
People from Skegness
1971 births
Living people